CAPITAL CITY CONNECTION (CCC) is an Educational television - Government-access television program designed to provide 24/7 viewing of city-related events and activities in Montgomery, Alabama, including live City Council meetings, Planning Commission and Board of Adjustment meetings, press conferences, tours of the Montgomery Zoo, Parks & Recreation sporting events, storybook time by the City-County Library and much more. Capital City Connection (CCC) television is a local Public, educational, and government access (PEG) channel that can be viewed on cable stations Charter 95 and Knology 96 in Montgomery, Alabama.

Montgomery, Alabama